The Lost Childhood and Other Essays is a collection of essays and book reviews by Graham Greene published in 1951.  Two of its four parts, Personal Prologue (i.e. The Lost Childhood) and Personal Postscript, comprise seven invaluable pieces of autobiography.

The part Novels and Novelists collects Greene's more or less professional looks at fellow writers, variously esteemed or deplored or fondly remembered, while Some Characters expands to takes in poets and other artists as well.

Novels and Novelists
 Henry James: the Private Universe
 Henry James: the Religious Aspect
 The Portrait of a Lady
 The Plays of Henry James
 The Lesson of the Master - also on James
 The Young Dickens
 Fielding and Sterne
 From Feathers to Iron - on Robert Louis Stevenson (the cousin of Greene's mother)
 Francois Mauriac
 The Burden of Childhood - on Rudyard Kipling and Hector Hugh Munro
 Man Made Angry - on Léon Bloy
 Walter de la Mare's Short Stories
 The Saratoga Trunk - on Dorothy Richardson
 The Poker-face - on Hesketh Pearson's biography of Conan Doyle
 Ford Madox Ford
 Frederick Rolfe: Edwardian Inferno - on Baron Corvo
 Frederick Rolfe: From the Devil's Side
 Frederick Rolfe: A Spoiled Priest
 Remembering Mr Jones - on Joseph Conrad
 The Domestic Background - also on Conrad, concerning his married life
 Isis Idol - on Charles Mallet's biography of Anthony Hope
 The Last Buchan - on Baron Tweedsmuir
 Beatrix Potter
 Harkaway's Oxford - on stories by Edwin J Brett in the Boys' Own Paper
 The Unknown War - on more recent stories in the B.O.P. and similar publications

Some Characters
 Francis Parkman
 Samuel Butler
 The Ugly Act - on John Connell's biography of W. E. Henley
 Eric Gill
 Invincible Ignorance - on Havelock Ellis
 Herbert Read
 George Darley
 An Unheroic Dramatist - on Roger Boyle, 1st Earl of Orrery
 Dr Oates of Salamanca - on Jane Lane's biography of Titus Oates
 A Hoax on Mr Hulton - on London tradesmen in the days of Bonnie Prince Charlie
 Don in Mexico - on Cambridge professor J.B.Trend
 Portrait of a Maiden Lady - on Beverley Nichols
 Mr Cook's Century - on Thomas Cook
 Great Dog of Weimar - on the painter Mathilde, Baroness von Freytag-Loringhoven

Notes and references

1951 non-fiction books
Books by Graham Greene
Eyre & Spottiswoode books
Essay collections
Books of literary criticism
British non-fiction books